The Zoological Journal was an early nineteenth century quarterly scientific journal devoted to zoology. 

It published "Original Communications, Translations of new and interesting Papers from Foreign sources and notices of new and remarkable facts in any way connected with Zoology".
 
The Zoological Journal was published in London by W. Phillips. The editors were Thomas Bell, John George Children, James De Carle Sowerby, George Brettingham Sowerby, and (later) Nicholas Aylward Vigors. It was established by a splinter group of the Linnean Society who favoured the Quinarian system and was only short-lived. 

Five volumes were published between 1824 and 1834: volume 1 1824-1825, volume 2 1825-1826, volume 3 1827-1828, volume 4 1828-1829, volume 5 1832-1834 (no issues 1830-1831).

References

External links
BHL Digitised text including plates
 Zoonomen
Chronophobia Scanned plates from Volume 3 and Supplements

Zoology journals
Publications established in 1824
Publications disestablished in 1834
English-language journals